Chuvanna Vithukal is a 1978 Indian Malayalam socio-political film, directed by P. A. Backer and produced by Salam Karassery. The film stars Santhakumari (Malayalam actress), Nilambur Balan, Kunjava, Nilambur Ayisha and Santha Devi in lead roles. It won the Kerala State Film Award for Best Actress for Santhakumari (Malayalam actress).

Cast
Nilambur Balan 
Kunjava
Nilambur Ayisha 
Santha Devi 
Santhakumari (Malayalam actress) 
Zeenath

References

External links
 

1978 films
1970s Malayalam-language films
Films directed by P. A. Backer